Jahmari Oshown Clarke (born 2 October 2003) is a professional footballer who plays as a forward for EFL League One club Forest Green Rovers, on loan from EFL Championship club Reading. Born in England, he is a youth international for Jamaica.

Career
Clarke made his professional debut with Reading in a 3–0 EFL Cup loss to Swansea City on 10 August 2021. Seven days later, 17 August 2021, Clarke replaced replaced George Pușcaș in the 76th minute during a 3–2 defeat to Bristol City to make his league debut. Clarke's first goals for Reading came on 6 November 2021, when he again came off the bench to replace George Pușcaș, and then scored both Reading's goals in a 2-1 victory over Birmingham City.

On 7 July 2022, Reading confirmed that Clarke had signed a new contract with the club.

On 29 October 2022, Clarke joined Woking on a month-long youth loan deal. On 31 January 2023, Clarke joined Forest Green Rovers on loan for the remainder of the season.

International career
In May 2022, Clarke was selected for the Jamaica Under-20 team for the 2022 CONCACAF U-20 Championship. He scored on his U20 debut against Costa Rica when after coming off the bench, he won and scored a penalty in the 98th minute, making the score line 1-1.

Career statistics

Club

International

References

External links
 

2003 births
Living people
Jamaican footballers
Jamaica under-20 international footballers
English footballers
English sportspeople of Jamaican descent
Reading F.C. players
Association football forwards
English Football League players